Cherry Lake is an unincorporated community in Madison County, Florida, United States.

History
The area was originally known by the indigenous Americans as Ocklawaha, and was first settled in the early 1830s, when Lucius A. Church purchased  for a plantation. The name of the area was formally changed to Cherry Lake in 1837, reflecting the name of the body of water it borders.

In the early 1930s the Federal Resettlement Administration, established as part of President Franklin D. Roosevelt's 'New Deal' program, acquired  of land at Cherry Lake to house families relocated from Tampa, Miami and Jacksonville. The settlement was originally called the Cherry Lake Rehabilitation Project, which was later changed to Cherry Lake Farm. This name was adopted by the local post office in December 1935. Only 132 of the planned 500 homesteads were built, each on a  plot of land. Residents attempted, unsuccessfully, to cultivate sugar cane and grapes, whilst others manufactured furniture. With the advent of World War II federal government support for the settlement was withdrawn and the majority of residents returned to their former homes or elsewhere.

In 1937 4-H youth organization purchased  of land adjacent to the lake and established a camp there.

Geography
Cherry Lake is at Latitude  30°37'06", Longitude  83°25'20".

Gallery

See also
 Ocklawaha, Florida

References

External links

Unincorporated communities in Madison County, Florida
Unincorporated communities in Florida